Roosevelt Memorial may refer to:

Franklin Delano Roosevelt Memorial, a presidential memorial in Washington, DC
List of things named after Franklin D. Roosevelt
See Franklin D. Roosevelt#Legacy for other memorials
Theodore Roosevelt Island, an island and presidential memorial in Washington, DC
See Theodore Roosevelt#Memorials and cultural depictions for other memorials

See also
Presidential memorials in the United States